Mount Dickerson is a prominent mountain, standing 6 km (4 mi) east of Mount Kirkpatrick in the Queen Alexandra Range in East Antarctica. The mountain was named by US-ACAN for LCDR Richard G. Dickerson, US Navy, VX-6 aircraft commander during US naval operations in 1964.

References 

Mountains of the Ross Dependency
Shackleton Coast
Four-thousanders of Antarctica